Mr. and Mrs. Gambler is a 2012 Hong Kong romantic comedy film written, produced and directed by Wong Jing and starring Chapman To and Fiona Sit.

Plot
Manfred and Flora are compulsive gamblers who can gamble on anything 24 hours a day, seven days a week. They meet at a casino in Macau, where they both suffer heavy losses and are held hostage by loan sharks. During their hostage ordeal, they start to have passion for each other. When they meet in Hong Kong again, they finally fall in love and decide to get married. After they marry, their luck turns, and they make great progress in both their career and relationship. They soon give birth to their daughter. With the assistance of a charming producer, Michelle, Manfred gets the chance to take a leading role in a new movie. The Casino Boss, Sam, invites Flora to work for him to chase away the con men. In fact, Michelle and Sam are ex-lovers. Both of them are now attracted by Manfred and Flora’s unique characters and go for them in full strength. Manfred and Flora cannot resist the temptation and decide to get divorced. However, both of them would like to obtain their daughter’s custody rights.

Cast

Theme song
Compulsive Gambling God (爛賭神君)
Composer: Wu Man Sam
Lyricist: Wan Kwong
Singer: Wan Kwong, Chapman To

Sequel
Due to the film's commercial success, director Wong Jing decided to make a sequel, titled Mr. and Mrs Player (爛滾夫鬥爛滾妻) starring Chapman To and Chrissie Chau. The film was released on 12 September 2013.

References

External links

Mr. and Mrs. Gambler at Hong Kong Cinemagic

Mr. and Mrs. Gambler Review at LoveHKFilm.com

2012 films
2012 romantic comedy films
Hong Kong romantic comedy films
Films about gambling
2010s Cantonese-language films
Films about actors
Films directed by Wong Jing
Films set in Hong Kong
Films shot in Hong Kong
Films set in Macau
2010s Hong Kong films